Lighwan (also Romanized as Līghwān; also known as Lighvān) is a village in Meydan Chay Rural District, in the Central District of Tabriz County, East Azerbaijan Province, Iran. At the 2006 census, its population was 5,350, in 1,055 families.

It is famous for slight weather during summer time and cold weather in winter. The main occupation of the people is agriculture, dairy and gardening. Lighwan's traditional feta cheese is the most famous cheese all around Iran. Its population is 5260.

References

External links

 Pictures from Lighwan

Populated places in Tabriz County